The Odum School of Ecology is a school within the University of Georgia and the successor of the UGA Institute of Ecology.  It is named after Eugene Odum, renowned UGA biologist, the father of ecosystem ecology, and the founder of the Institute.

History
It was started in 1961 as the Institute of Radiation Ecology, a research institute of faculty across various departments of the University.  In 1993 the Institute (having dropped "radiation" from its name) assumed the status of a school within the Franklin College of Arts and Sciences.  The College of Environment & Design (CED) was formed in 2001 by joining the School of Environmental Design and the Institute of Ecology.  Six years later, on July 1, 2007, the Institute split from CED and was renamed as the Odum School in honor of its founder, Eugene Odum.

Affiliated centers and labs
 River Basin Center
 Center for the Ecology of Infectious Diseases
 Marine Institute at Sapelo Island
 Joseph W. Jones Ecological Research Center
 Coweeta Hydrologic Laboratory
 Savannah River Ecology Laboratory
 Wormsloe Institute for Environmental History at the Wormsloe Historic Site
 Center for the Ecology of Infectious Disease

Degrees offered

Undergraduate
The following undergraduate degrees are offered by the Odum School:
 Bachelor of Science in Ecology (B.S.)
 Bachelor of Arts in Ecology (B.A.)

Graduate degrees
 Master of Science in Ecology
 Master of Science in Conservation Ecology & Sustainable Development
 Doctor of Philosophy (Ph.D.) in Ecology
 Doctor of Philosophy (Ph.D.) in Integrative Conservation

Certificates (non-degrees)
 Conservation Ecology
 Environmental Ethics

References

External links
 
 Announcement of the School's formation
 The Prehistory of the Odum School of Ecology
 Coweeta Hydrologic Laboratory

Colleges and schools of the University of Georgia
1961 establishments in Georgia (U.S. state)